Shadow Star is a Japanese manga series created by Mohiro Kitoh, originally serialized in Kodansha's seinen magazine Afternoon. In the United States, it was licensed by Dark Horse Comics and serialized in Super Manga Blast!.

There are twelve volumes total in the Japanese release, and seven in the English-language one. As a result of Dark Horse's rearrangement of the series' chapters, those seven volumes actually cover volumes 1 to 6 of the original Japanese release. Further chapters were serialized in Super Manga Blast!, and starting with the magazine's 54th issue, the series was translated in its original right-to-left reading format; this lasted until Super Manga Blast! was cancelled five issues later. These chapters have not been collected into volumes yet, nor has Dark Horse announced any plans to further translate Shadow Star.

Japanese volume list

English-language volume list

Chapters not yet in volume format
These chapters have yet to be collected into volumes. They were serialized in issues of Super Manga Blast! from September 2004 to February 2006.
"The Heart That Wraps the Flowers" / "... And, Lies."
"Norio Koga's Bedroom" / "The Value of..."
"Spring"
""The Warning Was an All-Too-Common Incident..."" / "The Garden of Ostentation"
"Calm Company"
"The Cup Runneth Over"
"The Cup Runneth Over, Part Two"
"Grudges, Part One"
"Grudges, Part Two"
"Grudges, Part Three"
"Grudges Part 4"
"Finite Power" / "Sheep"
"Each Others' Reasons" / "Two Little Runaways"
"Mother of Russia, Part 1"
"Mother of Russia, Part 2"

References

Shadow Star